STET – Società Finanziaria Telefonica (STET - Telephonic Financial Company in English) was an Italian company that operated in the telecommunications sector. It was IRI's holding company for this sector.

History 
STET was founded by IRI on October 21 of 1933 as the "STET - Società Torinese per l'Esercizio Telefonico" and was based in Turin with headquarters in Rome. The aim of the company was to address technical, administrative and accounting of all state's company for telephone services and for public telecommunications services in Italy.

In 1964 fostered the born of the research center CSELT to modernize the Italian phone service, and in 1976 the campus of Scuola Superiore Guglielmo Reiss Romoli was built in L'Aquila to support training activities for managers and executives of the group. In the late 60s the group company Selenia produced the first European minicomputer: the Selenia Gp-16.

In 1992, with the privatization carried out by first Amato government is changed to be "STET - Società Finanziaria Telefonica S.p.A".

In 1993, STET's managing director Miro Allione left the company to create Stream, which became one of the largest pay TV and digital satellite television networks in Italy.

In 1997 STET is merged with Telecom Italia, together with Telespazio and Italcable: the new company will be named Telecom Italia S.p.A., at the same time of the resignment of Ernesto Pascale, a STET's managing director and key person for the company.

See also 
Gruppo TIM
Stream TV
Istituto per la Ricostruzione Industriale

References 

Telecommunications companies of Italy
Mass media companies of Italy
Telecommunications companies established in 1933
Italian brands
Italian companies established in 1933
Privatized companies of Italy
Holding companies established in 1933
Italian companies disestablished in 1997
Holding companies disestablished in 1997
Telecommunications companies disestablished in 1997